Amistad is a census-designated place (CDP) in Val Verde County, Texas, United States. The population was 53 at the 2010 census. This CDP was formed prior to the 2010 census from parts of the deleted Box Canyon-Amistad CDP.

Geography
Amistad is located at  (29.5245, -101.1531).

Education
It is in the Comstock Independent School District.

The whole county is served by Southwest Texas Junior College according to the Texas Education Code.

See also

References

census-designated places in Texas
census-designated places in Val Verde County, Texas